This is a list of television programs currently or formerly broadcast on Cartoon Network and HBO Max's preschool block, Cartoonito in the United States.

Current programming

Original programming

Sesame Workshop

Warner Bros. Animation

Acquired programming

Short-form programming

HBO Max exclusive programming

Acquired programming

Upcoming programming

Original programming

Cartoon Network Studios

Warner Bros. Animation

Acquired programming

HBO Max exclusive programming

Original programming

Sesame Workshop

Former programming

Original programming

Sesame Workshop

Acquired programming

Canadian co-productions

Short-form programming

HBO Max exclusive programming

Original programming

Warner Bros. Animation

Sesame Workshop

Acquired programming

See also
 List of programs broadcast by Cartoon Network
 List of programs broadcast by Adult Swim
 List of programs broadcast by Toonami
 List of programs broadcast by Boomerang
 List of Sesame Workshop productions

Notes

References

Cartoonito
Lists of television series by network
Cartoonito original programming
Cartoon Network original programming
HBO Max original programming
Television programming blocks in the United States
Programs